Graham Paul Savin (born 22 September 1964) is a former English cricketer.  Savin was a left-handed batsman who bowled left-arm medium pace.  He was born in Oxford, Oxfordshire.

Savin made his debut for Oxfordshire in the 1986 Minor Counties Championship against Berkshire.  Savin played Minor counties cricket for Oxfordshire from 1986 to 2002, which included 99 Minor Counties Championship matches and 28 MCCA Knockout Trophy matches.  He made his List A debut against Gloucestershire in the 1989 NatWest Trophy.  He played 10 further List A matches, the last coming against the Lancashire Cricket Board in the 1st round of the 2003 Cheltenham & Gloucester Trophy which was held in 2002.  In his 11 List A matches he scored 223 runs at a batting average of 24.77, with a high score of 41.  With the ball he took 8 wickets at a bowling average of 49.87, with best figures of 3/33.

References

External links
Graham Savin at ESPNcricinfo
Graham Savin at CricketArchive

1964 births
Living people
Cricketers from Oxford
English cricketers
Oxfordshire cricketers